Minister of Human and Minority Rights  is the person in charge of the Ministry of Human and Minority Rights of Montenegro (Ministarstvo za ljudska i manjinska prava). In 2020, Ministry merged into the Ministry of Justice (Ministarstvo pravde).

Minister

References

Government ministries of Montenegro
Ministries established in 2006
2006 establishments in Montenegro
Human rights ministries